Encoder receiver transmitter (ERT) is a packet radio protocol developed by Itron for automatic meter reading.  The technology is used to transmit data from utility meters over a short range so a utility vehicle can collect meter data without a worker physically inspecting each meter.

More technical detail is explained in later .

Technical details 

ERT is an OOK modulated radio signal which is transmitted in the unlicensed 900-920 MHz band. The message is transmitted in the clear and uses Manchester encoding. The protocol uses frequency-hopping, a multiple access method to avoid interference with other nearby meters. SCM and IDM packet formats are described in

SCM packet 

SCM messages are 12 bytes.  Each message contains single, cumulative meter reading value along with the meter serial number, commodity type and checksum and tamper flags.

IDM packet 

IDM messages are 92 bytes and contain time of use consumption data.

Later patents describe further variations of packets with variable length.

Implementations 

Several vendors (besides Itron) have implemented ERT receivers (usually in order to read consumption data from Itron meters.)  Notably, Digi sells an ERT gateway, and Grid Insight sells a PC-based product called the AMRUSB-1.

It should be possible to decode ERT signals using general purpose UHF packet radios such as the Texas Instruments CC1101 or Freescale MC33696. A software-defined radio receiver has been implemented using inexpensive hardware: RTLAMR, and the rtl_433 software will decode SCM messages. Kismet (software) has an rtlamr data source.

References

Further reading 

 Grid Insight - Itron ERT technology
 Dave's Tech Blog - Itron Remote Read Electric Meter 
 RTLAMR - An rtl-sdr receiver for the ERT protocol

Packet radio
Smart grid